The 2021–22 Bosnia and Herzegovina Football Cup was the 26th edition of Bosnia and Herzegovina's annual football cup, and the twenty first season of the unified competition.

Sarajevo were the defending champions. Velež Mostar  won the cup after beating Sarajevo in the final.

Participating teams
The following teams took part in the 2021–22 Bosnia and Herzegovina Football Cup.

Roman number in brackets denote the level of respective league in Bosnian football league system

Calendar

Bracket

First round
Played on 28, 29 September and 6 October 2021.

Second round
Played on 27 October 2021.

Quarter-finals
Matches played on 2 March and 16 March 2022.

Semi-finals
Matches played on 6 April and 20 April 2022.

Final

The final was played on 19 May 2022.

Details

References

External links
Football Association of Bosnia and Herzegovina
SportSport.ba

2021-21
2021–22 in Bosnia and Herzegovina football
2021–22 European domestic association football cups